The Gooseneck Lake III Site, also designated 20DE43 , is an archaeological site located in Delta County, Michigan. The site dates from the Woodland period and is located about 60 feet from the water. It was listed on the National Register of Historic Places in 2014.

References

Geography of Delta County, Michigan
Archaeological sites on the National Register of Historic Places in Michigan
National Register of Historic Places in Delta County, Michigan